Joseph J. Fabbro (June 14, 1914 – January 16, 1978) was a Canadian politician, who served as mayor of Sudbury, Ontario from 1957 to 1959, 1964 to 1965 and 1968 to 1975, and as chair of the Regional Municipality of Sudbury from 1975 to 1977.

Fabbro also ran as a Progressive Conservative candidate in the Sudbury electoral district in the 1975 provincial election, but was not elected.

In January 1978, Fabbro died at the age of 63 of a heart attack.

Sudbury City Council 1957
The following is the list of aldermen who served with Mayor Fabbro on Sudbury's City Council in 1957.

References

1914 births
1978 deaths
Mayors of Sudbury, Ontario
Canadian people of Italian descent
Progressive Conservative Party of Ontario candidates in Ontario provincial elections